Gastridium ventricosum is a species of grass known by the common name nit-grass (British Isles) or nit grass (USA). This is an annual grass bearing a long, thin, smooth inflorescence of spikelets. It is native to Europe, North Africa, and southwestern Asia but has become naturalized in scattered locations elsewhere.

References

Pooideae
Grasses of Africa
Grasses of Asia
Grasses of Europe